Melica argentata is a species of grass endemic to Chile (Coquimbo and O'Higgins).

Description
The species culmes are rambled, and are either straight or zigzag shaped. It also has scabrous margins and bottom which is rough on both sides. It has secund branches with scabrous axis. Spikelets are solitary with fertile spikelets being pedicelled, pedicels of which are ciliated, curved, filiformed and hairy. The callus of the floret is pubescent and also has scaberulous rhachilla.

Both glumes are emarginated, are asperulous on the bottom and have no keels. The lower glume is 5–6 veined while the upper one is 5-veined. The species palea is 2-veined with ciliolated keels which are adorned on the top. They are dark brown in colour and have a linear hilum which is 1 length of their caryopsis.

Ecology
It grows with other species including Lithraea caustica, Wuillaja sapanoria, Colliguaya odorifera, Trevoa trinervis, Schinus polygamus, Acacia caven, Proustia pungens, Muehlenbackia hastulata and Melica longiflora. The flowering time is from August to September.

References

argentata
Endemic flora of Chile